The Claerwen Fault is a major SW-NE trending fault in central Wales. It was active as a normal fault during deposition of Late Ordovician to mid-Silurian sedimentary rocks, downthrowing to the northwest. The estimated throw on the fault increases from about 100 m at a shallow level to about 1000 m at depth. There is no discernible change in the grade of metamorphism associated with the Caledonian Orogeny across the fault, suggesting that it was not reactivated later.

See also
List of geological faults of Wales

References

Geology of Wales